

Places
 Sanda, Lahore, a village in Punjab, Pakistan
 Sanda, Gotland, a village in the island of Gotland; see Mästerby
 Sanda, Hyōgo, Japan
 Sanda University, Shanghai, China
 Various islands in Scotland:
 Sanda Island (Sandaigh), off Kintyre
 Handa Island (Eilean Shannda), off Sutherland
 Sanday, Inner Hebrides (Sandaigh), in the Small Isles
 Sanday, Orkney
 Sandray (Sanndraigh), in the Outer Hebrides

People

Surname
 Anthony Ichiro Sanda, Japanese-American particle physicist
 Bah Oumarou Sanda, Cameroonian diplomat
 Dominique Sanda, French actress
 Joseph Sanda, Cameroonian cyclist
 Makoto Sanda, Japanese author of Rental Magica
 Michal Šanda, Czech writer

Given name
 Sanda Ladoși, Romanian singer
 Sanda Mamić, Croatian tennis player
 Sanda Min Hla, 14th-century Burmese queen
 Sanda Oumarou, Cameroonian footballer
 Sanda Bouba Oumarou, Central African Republic basketball player
 Sanda Stolojan, Romanian poet, translator, and writer
 Sanda Toma (canoeist), Romanian Olympic sprint canoeist
 Sanda Toma (rower), Romanian Olympic rower
 Umaru Sanda Ndayako, traditional ruler, Nigeria

Other
 , a United States Navy patrol boat in commission from 1917 to 1920
 Sanda (sport), a Chinese full-contact combat sport
 Sandas, a Hittite lion god
 Sanda, the Brown Gargantua, featured in War of the Gargantuas (1966)
 Sanda (manga), a 2021 manga series written and illustrated by Paru Itagaki

Romanian feminine given names
Unisex given names